"J'voulais" is the second single from French R&B singer Amine's album, Au delà des rêves. It was released in January 2006. The song deals with a love relationship that came to its end because the girl was too possessive and jealous.

Success
The song went straight to number-one on French Singles Chart on 21 January 2006, staying for four non consecutive weeks at the top. Then it dropped, totalling ten weeks in the top ten, 19 weeks in the top 50 and 28 weeks on the chart. It was certified Gold disc by the SNEP. In Belgium (Wallonia), it charted for 17 weeks on the Ultratop 40, from 25 February, peaking at number ten for four weeks. In Switzerland, the single had a moderate success reaching number 27 on 26 February and featured on the chart (top 100) for 15 weeks.

Track listings
 CD single
 "J'voulais" – 3:20
 "J'voulais" (extended version) – 3:59
 "J'voulais" (remix featuring Bigali) – 4:16
 "J'voulais" (video) – 3:20

 CD maxi
 "J'voulais" – 3:20	
 "J'voulais" (extended version) – 3:59
 "J'voulais" (video) – 3:20
 "Touche pas à mon vote" (video)

Charts and sales

Weekly charts

Year-end charts

Certifications

References

External links
"J'voulais" music video

2006 singles
Amine (singer) songs
SNEP Top Singles number-one singles